Xestia staudingeri is a moth of the family Noctuidae. It is known from Siberia (West Siberian Lowland, Middle Siberia and the mountains of north-east Siberia), as well as North America (including Quebec and Newfoundland and Labrador).

References

Xestia
Moths of Asia
Moths of North America